Joanne Louis (born 27 April 1967) is a British former professional tennis player.

Louis made four singles main draw appearances at Wimbledon while competing on the professional tour in the 1980s and had a career high ranking of 282 in the world. She comes from Devon.

ITF titles

Doubles: (3)

References

External links
 
 

1967 births
Living people
British female tennis players
English female tennis players
Tennis people from Devon